1647 Menelaus  is a mid-sized Jupiter trojan from the Greek camp, approximately  in diameter. It was discovered on 23 June 1957 by American astronomer Seth Nicholson at the Palomar Observatory in California, and later named after the Spartan King Menelaus from Greek mythology. The dark asteroid has a rotation period of 17.7 hours. It is the principal body of the proposed Menelaus cluster, which encompasses several, mostly tentative Jovian asteroid families.

Orbit and classification 

Menelaus is a dark Jovian asteroid in a 1:1 orbital resonance with Jupiter. It is located in the leading Greek camp at the Gas Giant's  Lagrangian point, 60° ahead on its orbit . Since the discovery of the first Jupiter trojan, 588 Achilles, by astronomer Max Wolf in 1906, more than 7000 Jovian asteroids have already been discovered.

It orbits the Sun at a distance of 5.1–5.3 AU once every 11 years and 11 months (4,347 days; semi-major axis of 5.21 AU). Its orbit has an eccentricity of 0.02 and an inclination of 6° with respect to the ecliptic. Menelaus was first imaged at Palomar in November 1951. This precovery extends the body's observation arc by more than 5 years prior to its official discovery observation.

Menelaus cluster 

In 1993, Andrea Milani suggested that Menelaus might be the parent body of an asteroid family based on a modified HCM-analysis. The finding was also mentioned by David Jewitt in 2004, who noted that the Menelaus family is the largest proposed dynamical family to exist among the Jupiter trojans, despite having only 8 members.

In 2008, Fernando Roig and Ricardo Gil-Hutton described this particular aggregation of Jupiter trojans as the "Menelaus clan", which, similar to the Flora family in the inner asteroid belt, is composed of several families (or subfamilies). In this publication, the Menelaus clan encompasses a dozen clusters, if the separation criteria used in the HCM analysis are sufficiently relaxed. The principal bodies of these proposed family-like clusters include: 1647 Menelaus, 3548 Eurybates, 1749 Telamon, 12973 Melanthios, 13062 Podarkes, 5436 Eumelos, 2148 Epeios, 4007 Euryalos, 4138 Kalchas, 3063 Makhaon and others.

With the exception of the Eurybates family, which was studies in more detail by Jakub Rozehnal and Miroslav Brož in 2011 (also see ), all other proposed families with their principal bodies in the Menelaus clan, including Menelaus itself, are tentative and not listed neither on the Asteroids—Dynamic Site (Milani and Knežević), nor included in the robust HCM-analysis by Nesvorný (also see ). Instead, these bodies are considered non-family asteroids of the Jovian background population.

Naming 

This minor planet was named after the Greek mythological figure, Menelaus, husband of Helen of Troy, brother of Agamemnon, and king and leader of the Spartan contingent of the Greek army during the Trojan War. The discoverer followed the convention to name bodies located in the camp to the east of Jupiter after famous Greek heroes.

The Dictionary of Minor Planet Names also mentions that the lunar crater Menelaus was named after the Greek hero. However, based on the official International Astronomical Union–WGPSN nomenclature, it is named after Greek geometer and astronomer Menelaus of Alexandria (70–140). The official  was published by the Minor Planet Center in June 1960.

Physical characteristics 

Menelaus is an assumed C-type, while most larger Jupiter trojans are D-type asteroids. It has a V–I color index of 0.866.

Rotation period 

The Palomar Transient Factory in California obtained a rotational lightcurve of Menelaus from photometric observation in the R-band in October 2010. It gave a rotation period of 17.7390 hours with a brightness variation of 0.32 magnitude in the R-band. In February 2014, a refined period of  hours with an amplitude of 0.15 magnitude was determined by American astronomer Robert D. Stephens at the Center for Solar System Studies.

Diameter and albedo 

According to the survey carried out by NASA's Wide-field Infrared Survey Explorer with its subsequent NEOWISE mission, Menelaus measures 42.72 kilometers in diameter and its surface has an albedo of 0.056. The Collaborative Asteroid Lightcurve Link assumes a standard albedo for carbonaceous asteroids of 0.057 and calculates a diameter of 44.22 kilometers using an absolute magnitude of 10.5.

Notes

References

External links 
 Center for Solar System Studies, homepage
 Asteroid Lightcurve Database (LCDB), query form (info )
 Dictionary of Minor Planet Names, Google books
 Discovery Circumstances: Numbered Minor Planets (1)-(5000) – Minor Planet Center
 Asteroid 1647 Menelaus at the Small Bodies Data Ferret
 
 

001647
Discoveries by Seth Nicholson
Named minor planets
19570623